Jordan Dupray (born 13 March 1991) is a Malagasy international footballer who plays for French club Consolat Marseille, as a centre back.

Career
Born in Le Havre, Dupray has played for Le Havre B, Wasquehal, Grande-Synthe and Lège Cap Ferret.

He made his international debut for Madagascar in 2014.

References

1991 births
Living people
People with acquired Malagasy citizenship
Malagasy footballers
Madagascar international footballers
French footballers
French sportspeople of Malagasy descent
Le Havre AC players
Wasquehal Football players
Olympique Grande-Synthe players
US Lège Cap Ferret players
Association football defenders
Footballers from Le Havre
Black French sportspeople